Dennis Martin George (born 3 November 1983 in St Patricks, Grenada) is a West Indies cricketer who played first-class and List A cricket for the Windward Islands.

References

External links

1983 births
Living people
Grenadian cricketers
Windward Islands cricketers
West Indies B cricketers
21st-century Grenadian people